The Britz Canal, or Britzer Verbindungskanal in German, is a  long canal in Berlin, Germany. The canal was built between 1900 and 1906, and was previously known as the Britz Branch Canal or  Britzer Zweigkanal. 

The canal provides a shortcut for shipping from the Teltow Canal and Neukölln Ship Canal  directly to the Spree River, as well as serving several inner city ports. It has no locks.

References

 

Canals in Berlin
Buildings and structures in Neukölln
Buildings and structures in Treptow-Köpenick
Transport in Berlin
Federal waterways in Germany
Canals opened in 1906
CBritz
1906 establishments in Germany